Coleophora albicella is a moth of the family Coleophoridae. It is found in France, Spain, Corsica and Sardinia.

The larvae feed on Artemisia caerulescens gallica and Santolina chamaecyparissus. They create a tubular silken case. The surface has a number of fine, vague, length lines and a white dumentum. The case is 6–7 mm long, trivalved and has a mouth angle of about 0°. The case has a rather sharp bend just behind the mouth. Larvae can be found from October to June.

References

albicella
Moths described in 1885
Moths of Europe